Dickson Land is a land area between Isfjorden and Wijdefjorden at Spitsbergen, Svalbard. It forms a peninsula between the Isfjorden branches Billefjorden and Dicksonfjorden. Dickson Land is named after Oscar Dickson.

References

Geography of Svalbard
Spitsbergen